"When the Thought of You Catches Up with Me" is a song written and recorded by American country music singer David Ball.  It was released in August 1994 as the second single from the album Thinkin' Problem as the follow-up to the successful title track.  This song reached number 7 on the Hot Country Singles & Tracks (now Hot Country Songs) chart, and number 6 on Canada's RPM country chart.

Content
In the song, Ball describes instances when the memory of a lost love resurfaces, whether it be a beautiful day or in the dead of night.

Music video
The music video was directed by Chris Rogers.

Chart positions
"When the Thought of You Catches Up with Me" debuted on the U.S. Billboard Hot Country Singles & Tracks for the week of September 10, 1994.

References

1994 singles
1994 songs
David Ball (country singer) songs
Song recordings produced by Blake Chancey
Warner Records singles
Songs written by David Ball (country singer)